Epirrita is a genus of geometer moths first described by Jacob Hübner in 1822. They are on the wing from late August to November.

Species
 Epirrita autumnata (Borkhausen, 1794)
 Epirrita christyi (Allen, 1906)
 Epirrita dilutata (Denis & Schiffermüller, 1775)
 Epirrita faenaria (Bastelberger, 1911)
 Epirrita filigrammaria (Herrich-Schäffer, 1846)
 Epirrita pulchraria (Taylor, 1907)
 Epirrita terminassiae (Vardikjan, 1974)
 Epirrita undulata (Harrison, 1942)

References

 
Operophterini